Aigerim Mergenbay (Äigerım Mergenbai; born on April 18, 2000), known professionally as C. C. TAY, is a Kazakhstani singer and actress who is among the top five popstars of Kazakhstan. At the age of 5 years, she became the winner of the music contest “Aigölek”. In 2018, she was invited to perform her debut single “Mümkin emes” in the gala concert at the Junior Eurovision Song Contest. Her first album "Tusimde Korem" reached number 3 on the iTunes Chart in Kazakhstan. The album track "Nege" was later used as the soundtrack of the web series "Suikimdi Stories". In 2018, she played the main role in Bayan Yessentayeva’s film “Sisitay.”

References

External links 

 C.C.TAY.  (video clip)

2000 births
Living people
Kazakhstani film actresses
Kazakhstani television actresses
21st-century Kazakhstani women singers
21st-century Kazakhstani actresses